Leighton is an English surname. Notable people with the surname include:

 Alexander Leighton (1587–1644), Scottish physician and pamphleteer
 Alexander H. Leighton (1908–2007), sociologist and psychiatrist 
 Amanda Leighton (born 1993), American actress
 Baron Leighton of St Mellons, UK peerage title
 Bernardo Leighton, Chilean Christian Democrat 
 Clare Leighton (1898–1989), English-American wood engraver and artist
 David Keller Leighton, Sr. (1922–2013), American Episcopalian bishop
 Dorothea Leighton (1908–1989), American social psychiatrist and a founder of the field of medical anthropology
 Edmund Blair Leighton (1853–1922), English painter
 Edward Leighton (disambiguation), several people
 F. Thomson Leighton, computer scientist and co-founder of Akamai Technologies
 Florence Winsome Leighton (born 1948), the birth name of British television presenter Wincey Willis
 Frederic Leighton, 1st Baron Leighton (1830–1896), English painter and sculptor
 George N. Leighton (1912–2018), American judge
 Isabel Leighton (1899-1995), American actress and playwright
 Jane Leighton, English healthcare activist and television producer
 Jim Leighton, Scottish footballer
 Kenneth Leighton (1929–1988), British composer
 Laura Leighton (born 1968), US actor
 Michael Leighton (born 1981), Canadian ice hockey goaltender
 Roland Leighton (1895–1915), British poet and soldier who was killed in the First World War, and Vera Brittain's fiancé 
 Robert Leighton (author) (1858–1934), British author of historical adventure fiction and books about dogs. Father to Clare Leighton (1898–1989) and Roland Leighton (1985–1915)
 Robert Leighton (bishop) (1611–1684), Scottish preacher, Bishop of Dunblane, Archbishop of Glasgow, & academic
 Robert Leighton (broadcaster) (1956–2008), English broadcaster
 Robert Leighton (cartoonist) (born 1960), American writer, puzzle writer and cartoonist
 Robert Leighton (film editor), British film editor
 Robert B. Leighton (1919–1997), American physicist
 Warner E. Leighton, film editor, mainly for Hanna-Barbera

English-language surnames